The Men's 1978 World Amateur Boxing Championships were held in Belgrade, Yugoslavia from May 6 to 20. The second edition of this competition, held two years before the Summer Olympics in Moscow, Soviet Union was organised by the world governing body for amateur boxing AIBA.

Medal table

Medal winners

External links 
Results on Amateur Boxing

World Amateur Boxing Championships
World Amateur Boxing Championships
AIBA World Boxing Championships
B
International sports competitions in Belgrade
1970s in Belgrade
May 1978 sports events in Europe
1978 in Serbia